Väinö Veikko Sakari Huhtala (24 December 1935 – 18 June 2016) was a Finnish former cross-country skier who competed in the early 1960s. He won two medals in the 4 × 10 km relay at the Winter Olympics with a gold in 1960 and a silver in 1964. Huhtala also finished fourth in the 15 km event at the 1964 Winter Olympics in Innsbruck.

He also won a silver medal in the 1962 FIS Nordic World Ski Championships in the 4 × 10 km relay.

Cross-country skiing results
All results are sourced from the International Ski Federation (FIS).

Olympic Games
 2 medals – (1 gold, 1 silver)

World Championships
 1 medal – (1 silver)

References

External links
 
 
 Huhtala biography 

1935 births
2016 deaths
Finnish male cross-country skiers
Cross-country skiers at the 1960 Winter Olympics
Cross-country skiers at the 1964 Winter Olympics
Olympic medalists in cross-country skiing
FIS Nordic World Ski Championships medalists in cross-country skiing
Medalists at the 1960 Winter Olympics
Medalists at the 1964 Winter Olympics
Olympic gold medalists for Finland
Olympic silver medalists for Finland
People from Siikajoki
Sportspeople from North Ostrobothnia
20th-century Finnish people